"Dipset (Santana's Town)" is a song by American rapper Juelz Santana, released on July 20, 2003, as the lead single from his debut studio album From Me to U. The song features vocals from Santana's Dipset cohort Cam'ron. The video features a cameo appearance by fellow American rapper Killer Mike. The only single from From Me to U, the song reached #70 on the U.S. Billboard Hot R&B/Hip-Hop Songs chart. It was nominated at the annual 2004 Grammy Awards ceremony for the Best Rap Performance by a Duo or Group.

Charts

References

2003 singles
2003 songs
Juelz Santana songs
Cam'ron songs
Roc-A-Fella Records singles
Songs written by Juelz Santana
Songs written by Cam'ron